During the 1999–2000 English football season, Rotherham United Football Club competed in the Football League Third Division where they finished in 2nd position on 84 points and gained promotion to the Football League Second Division.

Final league table

Results
Rotherham United's score comes first

Legend

Football League Division Three

League Cup

FA Cup

Football League Trophy

First-team squad
Appearances for competitive matches only

Notes

References

Rotherham United 1999–2000 at soccerbase.com (use drop down list to select relevant season)

See also
1999–2000 in English football

Rotherham United F.C. seasons
Rotherham United